ISO is the most common abbreviation for the International Organization for Standardization.

ISO or Iso may also refer to:

Business and finance
 Iso (supermarket), a chain of Danish supermarkets incorporated into the SuperBest chain in 2007
 Iso Omena ("Big Apple"), a shopping center in Finland
 Incentive stock option, a type of employee stock option
 Independent Sales Organization, a company that partners with an acquiring bank to provide merchant services
 Insurance Services Office, an American insurance underwriter
 Intermarket sweep order, a type of limit order on financial markets
 Iso (automobile), an Italian car manufacturer

Arts and entertainment
 Isomorphic Algorithms (ISOs), a fictional race in the digital world of Tron: Legacy
 Iso (comics), a Marvel comics character

Music
 Iso (album), an album by Ismaël Lô
 Iceland Symphony Orchestra
 Indianapolis Symphony Orchestra, Indiana, US
 International Symphony Orchestra, of Sarnia, Ontario and Port Huron, Michigan, US
 ISO Records, a vanity label by British musician David Bowie

Organizations
 Imamia Students Organisation, an Islamic organization in Pakistan
 Independent system operator, a North American organization that coordinates, controls and monitors the operation of the electrical power system
 Internal Security Organisation, a government security agency in Uganda
 International Socialist Organization, United States Trotskyist organization, active from 1976 to 2019
 International Socialist Organisation (Australia), Australian Trotskyist organization, active from 1971 to 2008
 International Socialist Organisation (Germany), German Trotskyist organisation, established in 2016
 International Socialist Organisation (New Zealand), New Zealand Trotskyist organization, founded in the early 1990s
 International Organization for Standardization
 List of International Organization for Standardization standards, a list of ISO standards
  (Dutch National Students Association), the Netherlands
 Iran Scout Organization

People
 Mitsuo Iso (磯 光雄, Iso Mitsuo; born 1966), Japanese animator
 Iso Mutsu (睦磯, Mutsu Iso; 1867–1930), British writer
 , Japanese rower
 Volmari Iso-Hollo (1907–1969), Finnish athlete
 Iso Lero "Džamba", Yugoslav criminal

Places
 Iso-Heikkilä, a district in Turku, Finland
 Iso-Naakkima, a lake in Finland
 Iso-Roine, a lake in Finland

Science and technology
 ISO character set (disambiguation)
 ISO image, a file containing the whole contents of an optical disc
 ISO base media file format, a container format for time-based multimedia files
 ISO 5800, a film speed system
 Digital camera ISO, light sensitivity of a digital image sensor
 ISO 8601, a date format
 ISO(n), the Euclidean group
 Isopropyl alcohol, the simplest secondary alcohol
 Infrared Space Observatory, a space telescope active from 1995 to 1998
 International Science Olympiad, a series of science competitions for students
 Iso (fish), a genus of surf sardines in the family Notocheiridae
 Isomer, chemicals with the same chemical formula but different structures
 Isorhapontigenin, a stilbenoid (chemical)
 Isotonitazene, a benzimidazole-derived opioid analgesic drug, colloquially referred to as "iso"
 ISO: integumentary sensory organ

Other uses
 Imperial Service Order, an award in the British honours system
 Isolated Power, a sabermetrics baseball statistic
 Kinston Regional Jetport (IATA airport code: ISO), North Carolina, US
 Iso (American football), a type of play used in American football
 ISO (dinghy), a class of sailing dinghy

See also
 
 
 Isometric (disambiguation)
 ISOS (disambiguation)

Japanese-language surnames